Miss Happiness is the debut studio album by the American alternative rock band Walt Mink, released in 1992. It contains a cover of Nick Drake's "Pink Moon". The band supported the album with a North American tour.

Critical reception

USA Today wrote: "An idiosyncratic Cream for the '90s, Walt Mink adds daring innovation to the power trio formula." The St. Petersburg Times called the album a "kooky concoction of psychedelia and heavy metal."

The Orlando Sentinel determined that Walt Mink "has the chops and creativity of King's X but with more concision and without all the artsy overambition and concept baggage." Stereo Review labeled Miss Happiness "a mixture of guitar-driven sass and twee-voiced smarm."

AllMusic deemed the album "one of the brightest debuts of the '90s."

Track listing 
All songs written by John Kimbrough except Pink Moon, written by Nick Drake.
 "Miss Happiness" – 3:26
 "Chowder Town" – 3:02
 "Love You Better" – 3:55
 "Showers Down" – 4:08
 "Quiet Time" – 3:32
 "Pink Moon" – 3:15
 "Smoothing the Ride" – 3:09
 "Croton-Harmon (local)" – 3:32
 "Twinkle and Shine" – 3:03
 "Factory" – 5:53

Personnel 
John Kimbrough – guitar, vocals
Candice Belanoff – bass guitar, backing vocals
Joey Waronker – drums, percussion, backing vocals

Doug "Mr Colson" Olson – production, engineering, mix
Brian Anderson – engineering
Daniel Corrigan – cover photograph
Jen Schmid – painting

References

External links
 "Releases" page on Walt Mink's official site @ The Internet Archive (includes lyrics)

Walt Mink albums
1992 albums
Caroline Records albums